Clark County is a county in the U.S. state of Indiana, located directly across the Ohio River from Louisville, Kentucky. At the 2020 census, the population was 121,093. The county seat is Jeffersonville. Clark County is part of the Louisville/Jefferson County, KY–IN Metropolitan Statistical Area.

History
Clark County lies on the north bank of the Ohio River. A significant gateway to the state of Indiana, Clark County's settlement began in 1783. The state of Virginia rewarded General George Rogers Clark and his regiment for their victorious capture of Forts Kaskaskia, Cahokia, and Vincennes from the British, by granting them  of land. A small portion of this land, became known as Clarksville, the first authorized American settlement in the Northwest Territory, founded the next year in 1784.

Clark County was formed on 3 February 1801, with territory annexed from Knox, the first county formed in the Territory in 1790. This original area in Clark County was subsequently altered and reduced with the formation of other counties: Harrison (1808), Franklin, Jefferson, and Wayne (1811), Switzerland and Washington (1814), Jackson and Ripley (1816), Jennings (1817), Crawford and Randolph (1818), Fayette and Floyd (1819), Scott (1820), Union (1821), Decatur and Rush (1822).

The first county seat was established in Springville, on April 7, 1801. Jeffersonville was platted in 1802, and on 9 June the Territorial Governor (William Henry Harrison) ordered that it be regarded as the county seat. However, on 14 December 1810, the seat designation was given to Charlestown, which retained the designation until 1873, when on 23 September the Jefforsonville mayor (Luther Warder) successfully campaigned for the county seat's return.

Clark County was a hotbed for antislavery sentiment during the territorial period. In 1807, citizens petitioned Congress to uphold the legal prohibition of slavery established in the Northwest Ordinance in response to efforts by Harrison and his supporters to have the prohibition repealed. Many settlers were Quakers who had migrated from North Carolina to escape the oppressive conditions of the slave states and did not want to see slavery be established in Indiana.

From its beginning Clark County's history, culture and growth have been linked to the development of the river. Early nineteenth-century steamboats transported goods to the upper Ohio, providing opportunities for commercial and industrial growth in the county. In 1832, James Howard founded the Howard shipyards making Clark County a leader in shipbuilding.

The railroad brought further economic growth. The Monon line spanned from New Albany to Chicago, and the Jeffersonville, Madison, and Indianapolis Railroad provided Clark County and southern Indiana with access to the northern trading centers of Indianapolis and Chicago.

Industries locating to Clark County during the nineteenth century included the Louisville Cement Company in Speed, Indiana and the Ford Plate Glass Company established in Jeffersonville in 1876.

During the 1920s, Clark County attracted the Colgate-Palmolive Company to the Clarksville Riverfront. Colgate purchased the former Indiana Reformatory building in 1923. The company rehabilitated and adapted the building for its dedication in 1924. It stayed in business until early 2008.

During World War II the county prospered. The federal government began the Indiana Arsenal near Charlestown in 1940. Producing smokeless powder for the war effort, the arsenal employed up to 20,000. Howard shipyards was commissioned by the Navy to produce landing craft. Later Howard shipyards reorganized as Jeffersonville Boat and Machine Company (Jeffboat) — a current major employer (1991).

When the war ended, the county experienced significant residential and commercial growth, aided by the 1956 Interstate Act. The improved access provided by Interstate 65 encouraged additional subdivisions and shopping centers.

Clark County history has been closely associated with the development of the Ohio River. From its beginnings, Clark County relied on the river for economic opportunities. Clark County has diversified its economic base, lessened its dependency on the river, and continues to develop in new directions. However, the county still looks to the river as one link to its significant pioneer heritage.

Geography
Clark County lies on the east edge of Indiana; its eastern border abuts the northern border of the state of Kentucky (across the Ohio River). The terrain is low rolling hills, with the area either devoted to agriculture or urban development. The west part of the county is carved with drainages. The highest point on the terrain is a ridge WNW of Henryville near the border with Scott County, at 1,030' (314m) ASL.

Adjacent counties

 Scott County - north
 Jefferson County - northeast
 Trimble County, Kentucky - northeast
 Oldham County, Kentucky - east
 Jefferson County, Kentucky - south
 Floyd County - southwest
 Washington County - west

Cities
 Charlestown
 Jeffersonville

Towns

 Borden
 Clarksville
 Sellersburg
 Utica

Census-designated places
 Henryville
 Memphis
 New Washington

Unincorporated places
Source:

 Arctic Springs
 Belknap
 Bennettsville
 Bethlehem
 Black Diamond
 Blue Lick
 Broom Hill
 Carwood
 Cementville
 Clarke
 Dallas
 Dyeton
 Floyd
 Germany
 Hamburg
 Haussdale
 Henze
 Hibernia
 Hughes
 Longview Beach
 Marysville
 Nabb
 New Market
 Oak Park
 Otisco
 Otto
 Owen
 Prairie Crossing
 Prather
 Pulltight
 River Ridge
 Rockford
 Rolling Hills
 Runyan
 Slatecut
 Solon
 Speed
 St Joseph
 Starlight
 Sunset Village
 Sylvan Grove
 Underwood
 Vesta
 Watson
 Wilson

Extinct towns

 Andalusia
 Claysburg
 Oregon
 Port Fulton
 Springville

Townships

 Bethlehem
 Carr
 Charlestown
 Jeffersonville
 Monroe
 Oregon
 Owen
 Silver Creek
 Union
 Utica
 Washington
 Wood

Major highways

  Interstate 65
  Interstate 265
  U.S. Route 31
  State Road 3
  State Road 60
  State Road 62
  State Road 160
  State Road 265
  State Road 362

Airport
KJVY - Clark Regional Airport

Climate and weather

Two towns in Clark County, Marysville and Henryville suffered major damage during the tornado outbreak of March 2–3, 2012.

Government
For most of its history, Clark County was a Democratic-leaning county, its politics more in line with neighboring Kentucky than Indiana. However, the county voted for the national winner in all but 2 elections from 1924 to 2004 (1952, 1968). Since the start of the second millennium, the county has trended strongly Republican, moving away from its previous near-bellwether status.

The county government is a constitutional body, and is granted specific powers by the Constitution of Indiana, and by the Indiana Code.

County Council: The seven-member county council is the legislative branch of the county government and controls all the spending and revenue collection in the county. Four representatives are elected from county districts, and three are elected at large. The council members serve four-year terms. They are responsible for setting salaries, the annual budget, and special spending. The council also has limited authority to impose local taxes, in the form of an income and property tax that is subject to state level approval, excise taxes, and service taxes.

Board of Commissioners: The executive body of the county is made of a board of commissioners. The commissioners are elected county-wide, in staggered terms, and each serves a four-year term. One of the commissioners, typically the most senior, serves as president. The commissioners are charged with executing the acts legislated by the council, collecting revenue, and managing the day-to-day functions of the county government.

Courts: The Clark County Judicial System consists of 8 Courts:

Clark Circuit Court (Judge Daniel Moore)
Clark Superior Court #1 (Judge Vicki Carmichael)
Clark Superior Court #2 (Judge Jerome Jacobi)
Clark Superior Court #3 (Judge Joe P. Weber)
Jeffersonville City Court - Office Expired December 31, 2015
Charlestown City Court (Judge George Waters)
Clarksville Town Court (Judge Samuel Gwin)
Sellersburg Town Court (Judge Thomas Lowe)

By statute, the Circuit and Superior Courts have unlimited jurisdiction with the power to hear civil and criminal cases. City and Town Courts have jurisdiction to hear Ordinance violations and misdemeanor prosecutions, as well as civil actions where the amount in controversy does not exceed five hundred dollars ($500). Judgments in the City and Town Courts may be appealed de novo to the Clark Circuit Court. In addition, Clark Superior Court #3 maintains a Small Claims Docket. Local Rules of Practice may also limit the ability of a Court to hear certain cases. Judgments in other Courts may be appealed to the Indiana Court of appeals or the Indiana Supreme Court.

The Circuit and Superior Court Judges are assisted by 3 Magistrates, who are appointed and serve at the direction of the elected Judges.

The Circuit and Superior Court Judges are elected on a partisan basis, must reside within the county, and serve six-year terms. The City and Town Court Judges are elected to four-year terms on a partisan basis, and must reside within the City/Town.

Felony and Misdemeanor prosecutions are filed by the Prosecuting Attorney, who is elected on a partisan basis, must reside within the county, and serves a term of four years. The current Prosecuting Attorney, Steven D. Stewart, has been in Office since 1989.

County Officials: The county has several other elected offices, including prosecuting attorney, sheriff, coroner, auditor, treasurer, recorder, surveyor, and circuit court clerk. These officers are elected to four-year terms. Members elected to county government positions must declare a party affiliation and be residents of the county.

Elected county officials
Clark County is part of Indiana's 9th congressional district and is represented in Congress by Republican Trey Hollingsworth.; Indiana Senate districts 45 and 46; and Indiana House of Representatives districts 66, 70, 71, 72 and 73.

Due to decadal redistricting and the 2022 general election, Clark County is now represented in the Indiana State General Assembly by District 45 Senator Chris Garten, District 66 Representative Zach Payne, District 70 Representative Karen Engleman, and District 71 Representative Rita Fleming.

The Clark County Council has 5 elected officials (as of May 2018). The Clark County Council of 2019 includes:

 Barbara Hollis (District 1)
 Janne Newland (District 2)
 Brittney Ferree (District 3)
 Steve Doherty (District 4)
 David Abbott (At-Large)
 John Miller (At-Large)
 Kevin Vissing (At-Large)
 R. Scott Lewis (Attorney)

The three elected Clark County Commissioners are (as of 2019):
 Jack Coffman
 Connie Sellers
 Bryan Glover

Other county office holders as determined by the 2022 general election:

 Prosecutor: Jeremy Mull
 Sheriff: Scottie Maples
 Clerk: Ryan Lynch
 Auditor: Danny Yost
 Treasurer: Monty Snelling
 Recorder: Steve Gill
 Assessor: Butch Love
 Surveyor: David Ruckman

Demographics

As of the 2010 United States Census, there were 110,232 people, 44,248 households, and 29,474 families in the county. The racial makeup of the county was 87.1% white, 6.9% black or African American, 0.8% Asian, 0.3% American Indian, 2.6% from other races, and 2.2% from two or more races. Those of Hispanic or Latino origin made up 4.9% of the population. In terms of ancestry, 24.3% were German, 15.0% were Irish, 13.0% were American, and 9.8% were English.

Of the 44,248 households, 32.6% had children under the age of 18 living with them, 48.4% were married couples living together, 12.9% had a female householder with no husband present, 33.4% were non-families, and 27.6% of all households were made up of individuals. The average household size was 2.46 and the average family size was 2.98. The median age was 37.9 years.

The median income for a household in the county was $47,697 and the median income for a family was $58,090. Males had a median income of $43,053 versus $32,361 for females. The per capita income for the county was $23,592. About 9.0% of families and 11.8% of the population were below the poverty line, including 17.9% of those under age 18 and 7.5% of those age 65 or over.

2020 census

Education
There are three public school districts and the Archdiocese of Indianapolis that serve Clark County. The county is also served by two colleges that offer associate and bachelor's degrees.

Public school districts
Clarksville Community School Corp.

 Clarksville Senior High School
 Clarksville Middle School
 Greenacres Elementary School
 George Rogers Clark Elementary School (Closed 05/2010)

West Clark Community School Corp.

 Silver Creek High School
 Borden Jr/Sr High School
 Henryville Jr/Sr High School
 Silver Creek Middle School
 Borden Elementary School
 Henryville Elementary School
 Silver Creek Elementary School

Greater Clark County Schools

 Charlestown Senior High School
 Jeffersonville High School
 New Washington High School
 Charlestown Middle School
 New Washington Middle School
 Parkview Middle School
 River Valley Middle School
 Bridgepoint Elementary School
 Maple Elementary School
 New Washington Elementary School
 Northaven Elementary School
 Parkwood Elementary School
 Pleasant Ridge Elementary School
 Jonathan Jennings Elementary School
 Riverside Elementary School
 Spring Hill Elementary School
 Thomas Jefferson Elementary School
 Utica Elementary School
 Wilson Elementary School
 Options Alternative School
 Corden Porter School

Private schools
 Archdiocese of Indianapolis
 Our Lady of Providence Junior-Senior High School
 St. Anthony of Padua Elementary School(K-7)
 Sacred Heart of Jesus (PK-8)
 St. John Paul II School(K-8)

Colleges and universities
 Ivy Tech State College (Non-profit)
 Mid-America College of Funeral Services (Non-profit)
 Ottawa University - Jeffersonville (Non-Profit)

See also
 Louisville-Jefferson County, KY-IN Metropolitan Statistical Area
 Louisville/Jefferson County–Elizabethtown–Bardstown, KY-IN Combined Statistical Area
 National Register of Historic Places listings in Clark County, Indiana

References

External links
 Clark County government

 
Indiana counties
1801 establishments in Indiana Territory
Indiana counties on the Ohio River
Louisville metropolitan area
Populated places established in 1801